The 1999 Gael Linn Cup, the most important representative competition for elite level participants in the women's team field sport of camogie, was won by Munster, who defeated Connacht in the final, played at Bohernabreena. It was the first Gael Linn cu since the introduction of the 15-a-side game, although the competition was played with 15-a-side on an experimental basis in 1995.

New Sponsor
Schwarzkopf sponsored a Player of the Match Award at senior and junior level. Player of the tournament Fiona O'Driscoll and junior winner Lizzie Lyng received replicas of the Gael-Linn Cup and £1,000 for their clubs Fr O'Neill's and Rower-Inistioge). of The Rower-Inistioge.

Arrangements
Connacht defeated Ulster by 1–13 to 1–8, at Bohernabreena, Leinster defeated Ulster 7–38 to 0–4. Munster defeated Connacht by 1–18 to 1–9.

Gael Linn Trophy
Leinster conceded two early goals before beating Munster 2–10 to 2–8, Connacht defeated Ulster 1–4 to 1–1. Then Leinster defeated Connacht −17 to 4–6 to win the trophy for the first time in 13 years.

Final stages

|}

Junior Final

|}

References

External links
 Camogie Association

1999 in camogie
1999